Kirriereoch Loch is a small, shallow, square shaped, freshwater loch in Dumfries and Galloway, in the Southern Uplands of south-west Scotland. It is a part of the Wood of Cree Nature Preserve system

The loch is stocked with brown trout with wild brown trout also being present.  The Newton Stewart Angling Association manage fishing on the loch.

Survey
The loch was surveyed in 1903 by James Murray and later charted  as part of Sir John Murray's Bathymetrical Survey of Fresh-Water Lochs of Scotland 1897-1909.

References

Lochs of Dumfries and Galloway
Freshwater lochs of Scotland